Amritapuri, originally Parayakadavu, is the main Ashram of Mata Amritanandamayi Devi, the spiritual master, also called "the hugging saint" or Amma, which means 'mother' in many South Indian languages. This place is also the international headquarters of Mata Amritanandamayi Math. It is located in the state of Kerala, which is 8 km away from Karunagappally, 29 km away from Kollam, about 110 km north of Thiruvananthapuram, and 120 km south of Kochi.  Amritapuri is also the name by which the location of the ashram is now known.

Amritapuri is spread over 100 acres of land and is also the headquarters, and one of the seven campuses of the Amrita Vishwa Vidyapeetham, alias Amrita University.

Embracing the World is a global charity foundation operating under Mata Amritanandamayi Math.

History of the Ashram 
Initially, the Ashram was Amma's family home. Gradually, as Amma attracted more disciples, huts were built for them. In the same manner, the simple room where Amma still stays was also made. Throughout the early years of the Ashram, Darshan took place in the family cowshed. The cowshed was eventually converted into a small temple, the Kalari, which still exists today (it is now used to conduct pujas.)

Eventually, the number of visitors coming for Amma's darshan surpassed the Kalari's capacity. The Kali Temple was built at this time. It was the first large cement structure in the Ashram, built with only a modest budget, and took five years to finish (1988 to 1992). The Kali murti (based on the Kali at Dakhshineshwar Kali Temple) was crafted in Kolkata as per Amma's directions. The Kali Temple served as Amma's Darshan hall for the next few years.

After 2000, the Kali temple became too small for the large crowds coming to the Ashram, and an immense hall was built behind the temple. The main Darshan hall is the largest such hall in Southern India (30,000 sq. feet) with a seamless view with no obstructions. This main hall is where bhajans and darshan are held regularly.

Amritapuri now consists of flats for householders and visitors, hostels for students who study at the ashram college, large dining halls, offices and departments, and a hospital. After the 2004 Indian Ocean Tsunami, (when the Ashram was severely affected) the Amrita Setu Bridge was constructed for easy accessibility across the river. The bridge was inaugurated by APJ Abdul Kalam, former president of India.

Transport 
Nearest KSRTC bus stations -  1. Oachira (5 km)  2. Karunagappalli (9 km)

Nearest railway stations - 

1. Oachira (ocr) (9 km) 2.  (kpy) (9 km),  3. Kayamkulam (kyj) (15 km)
                                   
Nearest municipalities- 1.Karunagappalli (9 km)  2.Kayamkulam (14 km)

References

Ashrams
Religious buildings and structures in Thiruvananthapuram district